Abdelkrim Benyellès is an Algerian football manager.

References

Year of birth missing (living people)
Living people
Algerian football managers
MC Saïda managers
CA Bordj Bou Arréridj managers
CA Batna managers
USM Bel Abbès managers
WA Tlemcen managers
RC Relizane managers
Algerian Ligue Professionnelle 1 managers
21st-century Algerian people